Epitaph of  Adriaen Vryburch is a sculptural monument by Flemish sculptor François Duquesnoy. The epitaph sits on the pier directly opposite to the Tomb of Ferdinand van den Eynde in the church of Santa Maria dell'Anima in Rome. The epitaph was completed in 1629.

Subject
Vrijburgh was a young Netherlandish nobleman from Alkmaar, who, like Ferdinand van den Eynde, was part of the Flemish community of expatriates in Rome. In 1628 he dueled with another Netherlandish nobleman in Rome, and on December 19, 1628, he died from injuries he suffered in the duel. Like Van den Eynde, Vryburch died prematurely, aged twenty-three. He was buried in Santa Maria dell'Anima the next day. Vryburch was a Protestant, but his executors managed to get him buried in the church by promising that a beautiful white marble monument would be erected therein. Duquesnoy and Vryburch knew each other, as the Fiammingo had carved a portrait of him a few years before Vryburch's demise.

Sculpture
The administration of Santa Maria dell'Anima granted permission for the installation of the epitaph on the pier above Vryburch's grave in October 1629. Vryburch's uncle, Theodore Quinting, and the executor of his will Baldoin Breyel (an Antwerp born merchant and a leading member of the Flemish community in Rome) arranged for the commission of Vryburch's epitaph.

In the epitaph, two putti, casting mournful glances left and right, are raising a cloth with an inscription to Vryburch. They perch onto an animal hide hung around a coat of arms behind them. There are a ram's horns circling the coat of arms, which emerge from the holed hide and recall the theme of Isaac. The epitaph is completed by an urn at the monument's base. For this monument, Duquesnoy innovatively abandoned architectural frameworking, supplying just a cornice to support the coat of arms, and applying it onto an existing pier. The epitaph was inspired by Duquesnoy's study of Roman sarcophagi and cippi. Vryburch's putti are in fact more mature children than the typical putto. These are generally found on the cippi monuments. Be that as it may, Vryburch's putti were a further step forward in Duquesnoy's evolution of the winged infants to the "peak of [the putto'''s] evolution," represented in the Van den Eynde's putti. With its putti'' raising a cloth to the passerby viewer, the monument figures the "displacement of the untimely death away from one's homeland." The monument presents itself as a makeshift, roadside memorial. The employment of existing architecture further highlights this apparent marker's ephemerality.

References

Further reading

External links

 Epitaph of Adriaen Vryburch at the Web Gallery of Art

1620s sculptures
1630s sculptures
Sculptures in Rome
Sculptures by François Duquesnoy
Sculptures in Italy
Marble sculptures
Marble sculptures in Italy